Belfast is a city in Waldo County, Maine, in the United States. As of the 2020 census, the city population was 6,938. Located at the mouth of the Passagassawakeag River estuary on Belfast Bay and Penobscot Bay. Belfast is the county seat of Waldo County. Its seaport has a wealth of antique architecture in several historic districts, and remains popular with tourists.

History 

The area was once territory of the Penobscot tribe of Abenaki Native Americans, which each summer visited the seashore to hunt for fish, shellfish and seafowl. In 1630, it became part of the Muscongus Patent, which granted rights for English trading posts with the Native Americans, especially for the lucrative fur trade. About 1720, General Samuel Waldo of Boston bought the Muscongus Patent, which had evolved into outright ownership of the land, and was thereafter known as the Waldo Patent.

Waldo died in 1759, and his heirs would sell the plantation of Passagassawakeag (named after its river) to 35 Scots-Irish proprietors from Londonderry, New Hampshire. Renamed Belfast after Belfast, Northern Ireland, it was first settled in 1770, and incorporated as a town in 1773. The village was mostly abandoned during the Revolution while British forces occupied Bagaduce (now Castine). The British military burned Belfast in 1779, then held it for five days in September 1814 during the War of 1812.

Following the war, the seaport rebuilt and thrived. It was a port of entry, and designated county seat of Waldo County in 1827, although land would be set off in 1845 to form part of Searsport. Belfast was incorporated on August 17, 1850, as a city, the 8th in Maine, adopting its charter on April 3, 1852. It developed into a shipbuilding center, producing hundreds of three, four and five masted schooners. Materials for wooden boat construction were shipped down the Penobscot River from Bangor, the lumber capital of North America during the later 19th century.

Shipbuilders became wealthy, and built the Federal, Greek Revival and Italianate mansions and civic architecture for which the city is noted, including the 1818 First Church by master-builder Samuel French, and the 1857 Custom House and Post Office by noted architect Ammi B. Young. Wooden ship construction would fade about 1900, but with the advent of refrigeration, the local economy shifted to harvesting seafood, including lobsters, scallops, sardines, herrings and mackerel for the Boston and New York markets.

For the first 55 years the line was operated under lease by the MEC as its Belfast Branch but its operation reverted to the B&ML on January 1, 1926, when the lease was terminated by the larger road. Regular passenger service ended in 1960, and all operations in Belfast of any kind ceased in 2005, when the main yard was torn up. In 2011 the grounds of the former B&ML main yard and adjacent Stinson Seafood factory became the site of the Front Street Shipyard. The railroad's 1946 vintage engine house was torn down and its site is now occupied by the shipyard's , five-story boatbuilding and repair facility. In 2016 the city opened a rail trail on a  portion of the railroad right-of-way.

Shoe manufacture became an important business. After World War II, however, the Belfast economy was driven by its poultry industry, including two of the state's larger processors, Maplewood and Penobscot Poultry. Waldo County farms supplied the factories with up to 200,000 birds a day. The annual Broiler Festival became a popular summer event, attracting both local people and tourists. But the poultry business collapsed in the mid-1970s during a national recession, devastating the city and surrounding towns. In the early 1980s, the defunct chicken-feed silos at the foot of Main Street, that once fed millions of chickens, were demolished. There was an exodus of people seeking employment prospects elsewhere through the 1960s, 1970s and 1980s. But as they left, people attracted to the natural beauty of the coast of Maine, inexpensive land and homes, some who came to go "back to the land", artists and young college graduates moved in starting a renaissance.

In the early 1990s, credit card giant MBNA established two facilities in Belfast, one considerably larger than the other. The company was instrumental in establishing the Hutchinson Center of the University of Maine, an outpost of the University of Maine System, less than a mile from the main MBNA campus. Jobs provided by MBNA, which was recently acquired by the Bank of America, helped increase Belfast's population significantly.  Bank of America consolidated former MBNA operations in the larger of the two facilities.  The smaller complex was eventually taken over by athenahealth.  In 1996, shipbuilding was re-established on the Belfast waterfront with the opening of French & Webb, Inc., classic wooden yacht builders and restorers.  Following in their footsteps, Front Street Shipyard opened a major boatyard on the Belfast Bay in 2013.  Together, the two boatbuilding companies have restored Belfast's working waterfront and helped revive the city economy as well as appeal to tourists.  Movies filmed in Belfast include Peyton Place (1957), Thinner (1996) and In the Bedroom (2001) and the Frederick Wiseman documentary "Belfast, Maine" (1999) about everyday life in the city.

Geography 

Belfast is located at  (44.425896, −69.011646).

Situated on Belfast Bay and Penobscot Bay, Belfast is drained by the Passagassawakeag River. Other smaller rivers include Goose River and Little River.

Belfast is bordered by Waldo and Swanville to the north, Searsport to the east, Northport to the south, Belmont to the southwest and Morrill to the west. It is served by US Route 1, Maine State Routes SR 3, SR 7, SR 52. SR 137 and SR 141.

Climate 

This climatic region is typified by large seasonal temperature differences, with hot and humid summers and cold and dry winters.  According to the Köppen Climate Classification system, Belfast has a humid continental climate, abbreviated "Dfb" on climate maps.

Demographics

2010 census 

As of the census of 2010, there were 6,668 people, 3,049 households, and 1,729 families residing in the city. The racial makeup of the city was 96.7% White, 0.5% African American, 0.4% Native American, 0.4% Asian, 0.2% from other races, and 1.8% from two or more races. Hispanic or Latino of any race were 1.2% of the population.

There were 3,049 households, of which 24.1% had children under the age of 18 living with them, 41.4% were married couples living together, 11.5% had a female householder with no spouse present, 3.8% had a male householder with no spouse present, and 43.3% were non-families. 35.9% of all households were made up of individuals, and 17.8% had someone living alone who was 65 years of age or older. The average household size was 2.14 and the average family size was 2.73.

The median age in the city was 46.9 years. 19.9% of residents were under the age of 18; 6.1% were between the ages of 18 and 24; 21.4% were from 25 to 44; 30.6% were from 45 to 64; and 21.9% were 65 years of age or older. The city's population was 46.2% male and 53.8% female.

2000 census 

As of the census of 2000, there were 6,381 people, 2,765 households, and 1,692 families residing in the city. The racial makeup of the city was 97.56% White, 0.28% African American, 0.27% Native American, 0.28% Asian, 0.02% Pacific Islander, 0.27% from other races, and 1.33% from two or more races. Hispanic or Latino of any race were 0.69% of the population.

There were 2,765 households, out of which 25.8% had children under the age of 18 living with them, 46.8% were married couples living together, 10.8% had a female householder with no spouse present, and 38.8% were non-families. 31.5% of all households were made up of individuals, and 13.3% had someone living alone who was 65 years of age or older. The average household size was 2.23 and the average family size was 2.77.

In the city, the population was spread out, with 20.9% under the age of 18, 7.5% from 18 to 24, 24.2% from 25 to 44, 27.3% from 45 to 64, and 20.0% who were 65 years of age or older. The median age was 43 years. For every 100 females, there were 87.4 males. For every 100 females age 18 and over, there were 83.0 males.

The median income for a household in the city was $32,400, and the median income for a family was $43,253. Males had a median income of $30,514 versus $27,518 for females. The per capita income for the city was $19,276. About 10.0% of families and 13.2% of the population were below the poverty line, including 19.5% of those under age 18 and 9.1% of those age 65 or over.

Voter registration

Education 

Mascot – Belfast Lions

Colors – Royal Blue, and Gold

These three public elementary schools closed down in early 2000s (decade):

 Pierce School – Grades K–3 (Brief use as a private school)
 Anderson School – Grades K–3 (Now Waterfall Arts)
 Robertson School – Grades 3–5 (Not in use)

Schools Part of Belfast's MSAD #34 District :

 Captain Albert Stevens Elementary School – Grades K–5 Consolidation of Pierce, Anderson and Robertson Schools (Located in Belfast)
 Ames School – Grades 3–5 (Located in Searsmont)
 Weymouth School – Grades K–2 (Located in Morrill)
 Drinkwater School – Grades K–5 (Located in Northport)
 Nickerson School – Grades K–5  (Located in Swanville)
 East Belfast School – Grades K–5 (Located in East Belfast, nicknamed "East Side School")
 Troy A. Howard Middle School – Grades 6–8(Located in Belfast)
 Belfast Area High School – Grades 9–12 (Located in Belfast)

Towns in Regional School Unit #71 as of winter 2020:

 Belfast
 Belmont
 Swanville
 Searsmont
 Morrill

In order to save money, many schools in the state of Maine were forced to combine with other districts. Due to consolidation, MSAD #34 (Belfast) combined with MSAD #56 (Searsport) in the fall of 2009. The MSAD's no longer existed; they became one regional school unit, RSU #20. The RSU Superintendent was former Troy A. Howard Middle School and Belfast Area High School Vice Principal Bruce Mailloux. The former MSAD #56 towns of Searsport, Frankfort, and Stockton also became part of RSU #20.

Towns in the new RSU #20 District as of fall 2009 that were combined with MSAD #56:

 Belfast
 Belmont
 Swanville
 Searsmont
 Northport
 Morrill
 Searsport
 Frankfort
 Stockton Springs

Disagreements over inflating costs and the lack of local control over their students education caused several towns across Maine to consider withdrawing from these larger consolidated districts. One of these towns included Stockton Springs, which voted on March 25, 2014, to withdraw from RSU #20. At that time all eight municipalities within RSU #20 were at various points in the withdrawal process. These communities included Belfast, Searsmont, Stockton Springs, Belmont, Morrill, Northport, Searsmont and Swanville. Belfast voted in February 2014 to spend $25,000 to put together a report on the educational and financial impacts of leaving RSU 20.

Although consolidation was originally done to save money and increase the educational value of students from smaller towns, the consolidation was not widely perceived to be beneficial. Belfast, Belmont, Swanville, Searsmont, and Morrill withdrew from RSU #20 and established RSU #71.

Sites of interest 
 Belfast Historical Society & Museum
 Belfast Free Library, a public library established in 1887
 Front Street Shipyard
 Perry's Nut House

Belfast City Park
It is heavily used during the spring, summer and fall months and closed during the winter. When it was founded in 1904 by the Belfast Village Improvement Society, a local women's group, it was considered the group's biggest accomplishment.

Notable people 

 Nehemiah Abbott, U.S. Congressman and mayor
 Hugh J. Anderson, U.S. Congressman and 20th governor of Maine
 Charles G. Bryant, architect, soldier and adventurer
 Hodgdon C. Buzzell, State Senate President, probate judge and mayor
 Dorothy Cannell, novelist, mysteries writer
 William G. Crosby, poet and 23rd governor of Maine
 Donald DePoy, fifth-generation bluegrass musician, music educator, and music event organizer.
 Herbert L. Foss, Medal of Honor recipient (Navy), Spanish–American War
 Jonathan Frakes, actor (former resident)
 Genie Francis, actress (former resident)
 Linden Frederick, painter
 Harriet L. Hartley, public health doctor and medical school professor (20c resident)
 Harrison M. Hayford, scholar of American literature, top authority on Herman Melville
 Erin Herbig, Maine house majority leader
 Albert G. Jewett, diplomat (U.S. Chargé d'Affaires in Peru, 1845–1847; later Mayor of Belfast)
 Clara Savage Littledale, journalist, first editor of Parents magazine, born in Belfast.
 Hugh Dean McLellan, Federal judge
 Seth L. Milliken, U.S. Congressman
 Bern Porter, scientist, artist, writer
 William Veazie Pratt, admiral; Chief of Naval Operations (Navy's highest rank)
 Phineas Quimby, mesmerist
 Nathan Read, inventor, educator, steam-power trailblazer, Congressman, judge
 Dudley Allen Sargent, Harvard professor, physical fitness pioneer
 Robert P. Skinner, diplomat, U.S. Ambassador to Greece, the Baltic States, Turkey
 Joseph B. Smith, Naval officer
 Albert William Stevens, Army officer, balloonist, photographer; took first photos of Earth's curvature
 Live Oak Taylor, (George Edward Taylor), professional baseball player
 Edward Wilson Very, naval officer, inventor of the Very signal flare gun 
 Neil Welliver, artist, died in Belfast
 James Clarke White, M.D., physician, "Father of American Dermatology"
 William H. Wilder, U.S. Congressman, expert on world monetary policies
 Joseph Williamson, State Senate President
 John Wilson, U.S. Congressman
 Wendall Woodbury, television journalist and anchor

References 

Notes

Further reading 

 
 History of Belfast (1827)

Further viewing

External links 

 City of Belfast, Maine
 Belfast Free Library
 (An illustrated online history of the Belfast & Moosehead Lake Railroad, chartered in 1867.)

 
Cities in Maine
Cities in Waldo County, Maine
County seats in Maine
Populated places established in 1770
Populated coastal places in Maine
1770 establishments in Maine